Lava Kusha is a 2007 Indian Kannada-language romance film directed by Om Sai Prakash and written by Mohan Shankar. The film stars Shiva Rajkumar and Upendra, teaming up together again after Preethse. The film also stars Charmy Kaur, Jennifer Kotwal in the lead roles. The film was produced by Prabhakar under his Vijaya Productions banner.

The film revolves around two close friends who are part-time conmen. Circumstances force them to separate from each other and later realize to get back together again.

Plot

Cast
 Shiva Rajkumar as Chinni
 Upendra as Chakri
 Charmy Kaur as Sinchana
 Jennifer Kotwal as Sarah
 Hema Choudhary
 Sayaji Shinde
 Vinayak Joshi
 Girish Karnad 
 Sumithra 
 Tennis Krishna
 Satya Prakash
 Bank Janardhan
 Biradar
 Mandya Ramesh

Soundtrack
The music of the film was composed by Gurukiran.

Reception 
A critic from The Times of India said that "There is no excuse for the experienced Saipraksh to churn out a film which has no relevance to these times". A critic from Rediff.com wrote that "Lava Kusha may please the fans of Uppi and Shivanna".

References

External links 
 

2007 films
2000s Kannada-language films
Indian romantic action films
2000s masala films
Films shot in Bangalore
Films scored by Gurukiran
Films shot in Malaysia
Films directed by Sai Prakash
2007 action films